John Gaston Grant (January 1, 1858 – June 21, 1923) was an American politician who served in the U.S. House of Representatives.

John Gaston Grant was born January 1, 1858, in a log cabin in Edneyville Township, Henderson County, North Carolina. He was the fifth child of William Colin and Sarah Elizabeth (Freeman) Grant, of Henderson County, North Carolina. He was self-educated and a lifelong "Radical" or Republican. He was called "Cornbread John" by local Democratic-leaning newspaper, The French Broad Hustler. He married Zsa Zura Edney on March 30, 1876, in Henderson County, North Carolina.

Grant was a Member of the North Carolina House of Representatives in 1889, but declined a renomination. He was the sheriff of Henderson County 1892–1896 and refused a renomination in 1896. He was elected as a Republican to the Sixty-first Congress (March 4, 1909 – March 3, 1911). He was an unsuccessful candidate for reelection in 1910 to the Sixty-second Congress after which he resumed agricultural pursuits.

Grant died in Hendersonville, North Carolina on June 21, 1923, and is interred in Oakdale Cemetery.

References

1858 births
1923 deaths
Republican Party members of the North Carolina House of Representatives
North Carolina sheriffs
Republican Party members of the United States House of Representatives from North Carolina
People from Hendersonville, North Carolina